Schweikart may refer to:
Daniel Louis Schweickart, American engineer
David Schweickart (born 1942), American mathematician
Rusty Schweickart (born 1935), American aeronautical engineer, NASA astronaut, research scientist, U.S. Air Force fighter pilot, business executive and government executive

See also 
Schweikart